The 1930–31 season was the 36th season of competitive football by Southampton, and the club's ninth in the Second Division of the Football League. After securing their place as a top-half side in the Second Division over the past two seasons, the Saints began to lose their footing on the league and dropped to ninth in the division. The club failed to win any of their first four games of the campaign, briefly struggling to stay above the two relegation places, but had soon made their way to the top half of the division where they remained for the rest of the season. The Saints were unable to challenge for promotion to the First Division, however, briefly reaching the top five but remaining a long way off the top two sides. Southampton finished the season in ninth place in the table with 19 wins, six draws and 17 losses.

In the 1930–31 FA Cup, Southampton travelled to face First Division side Sunderland in the third round in January. The top-flight hosts beat the Saints convincingly 2–0, with the Second Division side dropping out of the tournament after just one game for the fourth season in a row (the second time in their history they had done so). Prior to the start of the campaign, Southampton completed a pre-season tour of Denmark from May to June which included games against Odense BK, AGF Aarhus, Aalborg BK (all of which they won) and Horsens fS (which they lost). They played just one more friendly match during the season, a 3–3 draw with Bournemouth & Boscombe Athletic in March 1931. The club ended the season with two games against Portsmouth, for the Rowland Hospital Cup and the Hampshire Benevolent Cup.

Southampton used 36 different players during the 1930–31 season and had fifteen different goalscorers. Their top-scorer was centre-forward Willie Haines, who scored 15 goals in 21 appearances in the Second Division, all in the second half of the season. Johnny Arnold scored eight goals in the league, followed by Herbert Coates, Bill Fraser, Bert Jepson and Johnny McIlwaine, all on seven goals. Ten players were signed by the club during the campaign, with six released and sold to other clubs. The average attendance at The Dell during the 1930–31 season was 12,371. The highest attendance was 23,156 against Tottenham Hotspur on 26 December 1930. The lowest was 8,785 against Charlton Athletic on 28 March 1931. The season was the club's last to feature manager Arthur Chadwick, who left in April.

Background and transfers
After the conclusion of the 1929–30 season, outside-left Stan Cribb joined First Division side West Ham United, having lost his place in the team to Johnny Arnold. Recently signed Scottish centre-half Alex Sharp also left the club, returning to his native country with Tranent Juniors. George Harkus left later in the summer, briefly joining French side Olympique Lyonnais. Southampton manager Arthur Chadwick brought in several players during the pre-season period. Most significant of the additions was Portsmouth captain Johnny McIlwaine, who signed in June for a club record fee of £2,650. Around the same time, the club also signed outside-forward Peter Cowper from Third Division North side New Brighton and inside-forward Laurie Cumming from divisional rivals Oldham Athletic. Billy Stage joined from Burnley in July. Just before the season started, goalkeeper George Thompson and forward Bobby Weale also left the club – the former joined Dinnington Miners' Welfare, while the latter signed for Cardiff City.

Transfer activity continued throughout the 1930–31 season. In September, the club signed full-back Reg Thomas on amateur terms from Western League side Weymouth (he turned professional in December). Horden Colliery Welfare centre-forward Arthur Haddleton signed the following month, when Thomas Groves left after his contract was cancelled. In November, amateur forward Sid Grover was signed from local Hampshire League side Romsey Town. In the new year, several more players were signed by Southampton. Romsey Town inside-forward Fred Allan and Cowes Sports winger Chris Crossley signed on amateur terms in March, and the following month goalkeeper Bill Soffe was brought in from Totton, another Hampshire League club. Grover, Allan, Crossley and Soffe were all rushed into the first-team for the penultimate game of the season against Portsmouth in May, having only made appearances for the reserves thus far, after 15 Southampton players refused to sign new contracts.

Players transferred in

Players transferred out

Players released

Players retired

Second Division

Southampton began the 1930–31 Second Division season on 30 August 1930 with a 5–0 loss at Preston North End, which sent the club straight to the bottom of the league table. Draws at home to Nottingham Forest and Burnley were followed by another away defeat against Oldham Athletic, leaving the Saints firmly in the battle against relegation. The club's fortunes quickly turned around, however, as they embarked on an eight-match unbeaten run which included five wins to help them move up to the top seven of the table. Much of the rest of the calendar year was spent alternating between winning and losing, during which time the team remained in the middle of the table. In November and December the club picked up wins over promotion hopefuls such as Tottenham Hotspur and Preston North End, while dropping points to strugglers like Cardiff City and Bristol City. They remained in the top eight of the Second Division table by the end of December, still in with a chance of reaching promotion.

The pattern of Southampton's season continued throughout the early months of 1931, as the team won against a host of lower-placed sides and lost against those in the higher level of the table. After drawing 3–3 with Plymouth Argyle on 17 January, the Saints did not draw again for the rest of the season, contributing to a club record 27 games without sharing points which extended into the early stages of the following season. After returning to the side in late December, centre-forward Willie Haines took over from Herbert Coates as the season's top scorer when he scored 15 goals in the last 20 games of the league, including three consecutive matches in which he scored twice in January. With Southampton safe in the top half of the table, manager Arthur Chadwick departed from the club on 16 April 1931 and retired from management, following a 23-year career. The club finished in seventh place with 19 wins, six draws and 17 losses, ten points behind West Bromwich Albion in the first promotion place.

List of match results

Final league table

Results by matchday

FA Cup

Southampton entered the 1930–31 FA Cup in the third round, travelling north to face First Division side Sunderland on 10 January 1931 in the first competitive meeting between the two clubs. Club historians described the hosts as "by far the better side", with the Saints going a goal down within ten minutes of the start of the game before being eliminated with a second goal later on. The team were weak in both defence and attack, with the performances of Bert Shelley and Johnny McIlwaine (playing at centre-forward in place of Willie Haines, who was absent due to illness) singled out by club historians as particularly poor.

Other matches
Outside of the league and the FA Cup, Southampton played seven additional first-team matches during the 1930–31 season. Shortly after the previous season's Hampshire Benevolent Cup and Rowland Hospital Cup games against Portsmouth, the club conducted a close season tour of Denmark in which they played four matches against local Danish league teams. The Saints won three of these games, beating Odense BK 3–0 on 25 May, AGF Aarhus 4–0 on 29 May and Aalborg BK 3–1 on 1 June, before losing 4–3 to Horsens fS on 5 June. The only other friendly match the club played during the season was against local Third Division South side Bournemouth & Boscombe Athletic on 25 March 1931 at Dean Court. The game ended in a 3–3 draw, with Willie Haines scoring a hat-trick for the visiting Saints.

Prior to the club's penultimate game of the season, at home to Portsmouth in the Hampshire Benevolent Cup, 15 Southampton players had turned down new contracts from the club and refused to play again. As a result, the club had to field a team including a number of reserves and former players who had agreed to step in as guests, including wing-half Len Butt, centre-forward Bill Rawlings and inside-forward Arthur Dominy. Organised by Hampshire FA secretary G. J. Eden, the makeshift side lost 4–0 to Portsmouth at The Dell, with goals scored by Jack Weddle, Jimmy Easson and Septimus Rutherford (two). The Rowland Hospital Cup game two days later featured a team consisting mainly of reserve players, with Fred Allan and Arthur Haddleton scoring for the Saints in the 2–2 draw at Fratton Park.

Player details
Southampton used 36 different players during the 1930–31 season, 15 of whom scored during the campaign. The team played in a 2–3–5 formation throughout, using two full-backs, three half-backs, two outside forwards, two inside forwards and a centre-forward. Arthur Bradford, Bert Jepson and Bill Adams made the most appearances for the club during the campaign, all playing in 40 games across all competitions. Left-back Michael Keeping played in 39 games, missing four league matches and the two end-of-season cup games. Centre-forward Willie Haines finished as the season's top scorer with 15 goals in the Second Division, followed by Johnny Arnold on eight goals. Four players – Herbert Coates, Bill Fraser, Bert Jepson and Johnny McIlwaine – scored seven goals in the league.

At the end of the season, 15 players offered new contracts by the club refused to sign the terms or play in the final games of the season against Portsmouth. For the Hampshire Benevolent Cup match, Hampshire FA secretary G. J. Eden arranged a "Hampshire County Team" to play against Pompey at The Dell, which included just three players with first-team appearances during the season. Alongside Bill Adams, Arthur Haddleton and Coates were reserve team players Bill Soffe, Reg Thomas and Ernie Warren, as well as returning former players Len Butt, George Harkus, Bill Rawlings and Arthur Dominy, plus Cardiff City striker Frank Matson. Soffe, Thomas and Warren also played in the Rowland Hospital Cup, alongside fellow reserves Fred Allan, Chris Crossley and Sid Grover.

Squad statistics

Most appearances

Top goalscorers

Footnotes

References

Bibliographty

External links
Southampton F.C. official website

Southampton F.C. seasons
Southampton